Dmitry Andreyevich Kaptilovich (born 22 February 2003) is a Russian football player who plays for FC Zvezda Saint Petersburg.

Club career
He made his debut for the main team of CSKA Moscow on 23 September 2021 in a Russian Cup game against FC Zenit-Izhevsk.

Career statistics

References

External links
 
 
 

2003 births
Living people
Russian footballers
Association football defenders
PFC CSKA Moscow players